Sombrero (variously Sombrero Islet) is a small, cone-shaped island in northeastern Iloilo, Philippines. It is part of the municipality of Concepcion.

Location and geography 

Sombrero Island is east of Panay Island in the Visayan Sea.

See also 

 List of islands in the Philippines

References

External links
 Sombrero Island at OpenStreetMap

Islands of Iloilo